The Lumières Award is a French film award presented by the Académie des Lumières to honor the best in the French-speaking cinema of the previous year. The awards ceremony is organized by the Académie des Lumières which consists of over 200 representatives of the international press based in Paris. Today it is regarded as one of the most prestigious French film industry awards, equivalent to the Golden Globe Award presented by the Hollywood Foreign Press Association.

History 

The Lumières Award was initiated in 1995 by French producer Daniel Toscan du Plantier and American journalist and ex-Newsweek's Paris correspondent Edward Behr. Their idea was to replicate the Golden Globes given by the foreign press in Hollywood. The Lumières Award is usually presented a month before the César Award, the French national film award.

Directing Board 

The president of the Academy is Lisa Nesselson, the vice-presidents are Pamela Bienzobas and José Maria Riba, the treasurer is Min Liu, the general secretary is Jacques Kermabon and the general delegate is Anne Guimet.

Award categories

Current categories 
Best Film: since 1996
Best Director: since 1996
Best Actor: since 1996
Best Actress: since 1996
Best Screenplay: since 1996
Most Promising Actor: since 2000
Most Promising Actress: since 2000
Best First Film: since 2014
Best Cinematography: since 2008
Best Music: since 2016
Best Documentary: since 2016
Best Animated Film: since 2017
Best international co-production: since 2020
Honorary Lumières Award

Discontinued categories 
 World Audience Award
 Special Jury Prize
 Best Foreign Film
Best French-Language Film

Ceremonies

See also
César Award
Louis Delluc Prize
Magritte Award
Golden Globe Award

References

External links 

 
 
 Lumières Award at AlloCiné
 Lumières Award at Facebook

 
French film awards
Awards established in 1935
Awards disestablished in 1985
Awards established in 1996
1935 establishments in France
1985 disestablishments in France
Recurring events established in 1996
Annual events in France